Slap happy may refer to:

Slap-Happy, an album by American rock band L7
Slap Happy Cartoons, a Canadian animation company
Slap Happy, a pornographic film series
Slaphappy: Pride, Prejudice, and Professional Wrestling, a nonfiction book by Thomas Hackett
Slapp Happy, a German rock band
Slapp Happy (album), the band's second album

See also

Slap Happy Lion
Slap-Happy Pappy
Slaphappy Sleuths
Happy slapping